Melandsjøen or Melandsjø is a village in the municipality of Hitra in Trøndelag county, Norway.  The village is located on the north shore of the island of Hitra, just across the strait from the island of Dolmøya.

Melandsjøen was the administrative center of the municipality of Hitra prior to 1964 when the four municipalities on the island were merged and the administrative center was moved to the village of Fillan.

Melandsjøen is the home to the Hitra Church, the main church of the municipality.

References

Hitra
Villages in Trøndelag